The Argentine legislative elections of 1930 were held on 2 March. Voters chose their legislators, with a turnout of 75%.

Background

The Wall Street Crash of 1929, as in much of the rest of the world, abruptly clouded Argentina's political, as well as economic, landscape. Hipólito Yrigoyen, who was overwhelmingly returned to the Presidency in 1928, advanced a progressive agenda during his first year in office, establishing a Ministry of Health, securing trade pacts with the British Empire that promoted import substitution industrialization, and increasing investments in education, the sciences, and the state oil concern, YPF. 
   
This latter policy made his administration a target of Standard Oil, which had growing interests in the country's energy sector. Yrigoyen's second term inherited considerable domestic opposition, as well, from his 1916—22 administration, when policy differences with the conservative wing of the UCR provoked his removal of 18 governors by decree. This opposition had never achieved unity, however, and were no match for Yrigoyen's popularity. 
  
The collapse that followed the 1929 crash proved to be real challenge for Yrigoyen. Scorned by much of the media for his age and alleged senility, the president reacted quickly to the crisis. He loosened credit, moved to delay farm evictions, and intervened against massive capital flight by rescinding the gold standard in Argentina, thereby stymying the movement of gold overseas (around 200 million dollars' worth had been removed from local banks after the crash via this mechanism). These measures helped maintain the populist leader's base of support, as did possibly the December 24, 1929, attempt on his life, and only added to its opposition by the financial sector.   

The results of the legislative elections, held on March 2, 1930, reflected some erosion in Yrigoyen's base, as the UCR lost 19% off its 1928 landslide vote totals. Turnout remained high, however, and the UCR added six seats to their already commanding majority in the Lower House. Winning in 10 of 14 districts renewing seats, the UCR lost in the City of Buenos Aires, where a schism in the Socialist Party resulted in victory for the more conservative group, the Independent Socialists. Right-wing opposition also won in Córdoba Province, where Julio Roca's Democratic Party made gains.

Having lost at the ballot box, Yrigoyen's opponents in both domestic politics and foreign corporate boardrooms redoubled their efforts, marshaling news editorials, provincial legislatures and, ultimately, elements in the Argentine military against the aging leader. An August 9 resolution in the Lower House, signed by 44 conservatives, called for Yrigoyen's resignation, and following numerous clashes and acts of sabotage, Generals José Félix Uriburu and Agustín Justo took power in a September 6 coup d'état.

Results

References 

1930
1930 elections in South America
1930 in Argentina